Mortimer Neal Thomson (September 2, 1832June 25, 1875) was an American journalist and humorist who wrote under the pseudonym Q. K. Philander Doesticks. He was born in Riga, New York and grew up in Ann Arbor, Michigan. He attended Michigan University but was expelled along with several others either for his involvement in secret societies or for "too much enterprise in securing subjects for the dissecting room." After a brief period working in theater, he became a journalist and lecturer.

For his published writings, he used the pen name "Q. K. Philander Doesticks, P. B.", a  pseudonym he had first used in university (the full version is "Queer Kritter Philander Doesticks, Perfect Brick").  A collection published in 1855, Doesticks What He Says, reprinted many of his pieces. In 1856 he wrote Plu-Ri-Bus-Tah, a parody of Henry Wadsworth Longfellow's The Song of Hiawatha. Thomson is credited with coining terms including brass knuckles, gutter-snipe, good and ready, and grin and bear it.

In 1858, Thomson's wife died in childbirth. Three months later, as a correspondent for the New York Tribune he wrote a report on the Pierce Butler slave sale in Savannah, Georgia in 1859 that was subsequently published as a tract by the American Anti-slavery Society and translated into several languages.

Thomson died in New York City on June 25, 1875. In 1888, when his short piece, "A New Patent Medicine Operation", was anthologized in Mark Twain's Library of Humor, an introductory paragraph described Thomson as a figure whose "dashing and extravagant drolleries" had quickly passed from fashion.

Books
Doesticks: A Poetical Letter ... to His Younger Brother, Containing a Thousand and One Lines. Detroit: Wales, 1854.
Doesticks What He Says. New York: E. Livermore, 1855.
Plu-Ri-Bus-Tah: a song that's by no author, a deed without a name. New York: Livermore & Rudd, 1856.
(with Edward Fitch Underhill) The History and Records of the Elephant Club: Comp. from Authentic Documents Now in Possession of the Zoological Society. New York: Livermore & Rudd, 1856.
Nothing to Say: a Slight Slap at Mobocratic Snobbery, Which Has 'Nothing to Do' with 'Nothing to Wear'''. New York: Rudd, 1857.Great Auction Sale of Slaves at Savannah, Georgia, March 2d and 3d, 1859. New York: American Anti-slavery Society, 1859.The Witches of New York, as Encountered by Q.K. Philander Doesticks, P.B. New York: Rudd & Carleton, 1859.The Lady of the Lake: A Travestie in One Act. The minor drama, no. 176. New York: S. French, 1860.

Notes

References
Johnson, Rossiter, and John Howard Brown. The Twentieth Century Biographical Dictionary of Notable Americans. Boston: Biographical Society, 1904.
Twain, Mark, E. W. Kemble, William Dean Howells, and Charles Hopkins Clark. Mark Twain's Library of Humor. New York: Charles L. Webster & Co, 1888.New York Times'': "Mortimer Thomson–'Doesticks'," June 26, 1875, accessed April 7, 2010

External links
 
 
 

1832 births
1875 deaths
People from Monroe County, New York
American humorists
19th-century American journalists
American male journalists
19th-century American male writers
Writers from Ann Arbor, Michigan
Writers from New York (state)
University of Michigan alumni